Neudamm railway station is a railway station serving the Neudamm campus of the University of Namibia, an experimental farm. It is part of the TransNamib Railway, located along the  Windhoek to Gobabis line. This line was built in 1929/1930.

See also 

 Railway stations in Namibia

References 

Railway stations in Namibia
TransNamib Railway